Manyema FC is a football club in Dar es Salaam, Tanzania. . They play in the top level of Tanzanian professional football, the Tanzanian Premier League. 

Football clubs in Tanzania
Sport in Dar es Salaam